Tsonyo Dimitrov Vasilev (7 January 1952 – 2 June 2015) was a Bulgarian football defender who played for Bulgaria in the 1974 FIFA World Cup. 

Vasilev made 199 appearances at left back for CSKA Sofia and also represented Volov Shumen.

Honours

Club
CSKA Sofia
 A Group (4): 1974–75, 1975–76, 1979–80, 1980–81
 Bulgarian Cup: 1973–74

References

External links
FIFA profile

1952 births
2015 deaths
Bulgarian footballers
Bulgaria international footballers
Association football defenders
PFC CSKA Sofia players
Ethnikos Achna FC players
1974 FIFA World Cup players
First Professional Football League (Bulgaria) players
Bulgarian football managers
People from Targovishte